WOW Next 2007 is an album in the WOW series, comprising twelve top Contemporary Christian music songs on one album.  It was given free with any WOW purchase.

Track listing

References

External links 
 WOW Next 2007 at YourMusicZone.  Retrieved 2009-04-18.

WOW series albums
2006 compilation albums